Nationality words link to articles with information on the nation's poetry or literature (for instance, Irish or France).

Events

Works published

United Kingdom
 Robert Blair, The Grave a work representative of the Graveyard poets movement
 Samuel Boyse, Albion's Triumph
 James Bramston, The Crooked Six-pence, published anonymously, attributed to Bramston by Isaac Reed in his Repository 1777; a parody of John Philips' The Splendid Shilling 1705, and that poem's text is included in this publication
 William Collins, Verses Humbly Address'd to Sir Thomas Hammer on his Edition of Shakespear's Works, published anonymously "By a Gentleman of Oxford"
 Thomas Cooke, An Epistle to the Countess of Shaftesbury
 Philip Doddridge, The Principles of the Christian Religion
 Robert Dodsley, Pain and Patience
 Philip Francis, translator, The Odes, Epodes, and Carmen Seculare of Horace, very popular translation, published this year in London (originally published in 1742 in Dublin; two more volumes, The Satires of Horace and The Epistles and Art of Poetry of Horace published 1746; see also A Poetical Translation of the Works of Horace 1747)); Irish writer published in England
 Joseph Green (poet), "The Disappointed Cooper", mocking an old man's marriage to a woman half his age and criticizing the behavior of some New Light ministers; English Colonial America
 Aaron Hill, The Fanciad: An heroic poem, published anonymously
 David Mallet, Poems on Several Occasions
 Alexander Pope, The New Dunciad
 William Whitehead, An Essay on Ridicule

Other
 André Philippe de Prétot, Le Recueil du Parnasse, ou, nouveau choix de pieces fugitives en prose & en vers, Paris: Chez Briasson, France

Births
Death years link to the corresponding "[year] in poetry" article:
 March 14 – Hannah Cowley (died 1809), English dramatist and poet
 June 20 – Anna Laetitia Barbauld, (died 1825), English poet, essayist, and children's author
 November 18 – Johannes Ewald (died 1781), Danish national dramatist and poet
 December 10 – Johann Christoph Schwab (died 1821), German
 December 23 – Ippolit Bogdanovich (died 1803), Russian classicist author of light poetry, best known for his long poem Dushenka
 Approximate date – Eibhlín Dubh Ní Chonaill (died 1800), Irish noblewoman and poet, composer of the Caoineadh Airt Uí Laoghaire

Deaths
Birth years link to the corresponding "[year] in poetry" article:
 May 6  – Andrew Michael Ramsay (born 1686), Scottish-born writer and poet who lived most of his adult life in France
 June 26 – Joseph Relph (born 1712), Cumberland poet
 August 1 – Richard Savage (born  1697), English poet
 October 5 – Henry Carey (born 1687), English poet, dramatist and songwriter, suicide
 December 22 – James Bramston (born 1694), English poet and satirist

See also

 Poetry
 List of years in poetry
 List of years in literature
 18th century in poetry
 18th century in literature
 Augustan poetry
 Scriblerus Club

Notes

18th-century poetry
Poetry